Saginaw is an unincorporated community in Lane County, Oregon, United States.  Saginaw had a post office with a ZIP code 97472 until the market it operated in was closed.  Saginaw lies at the intersection of Oregon Route 99 and Saginaw Road, just west of the Saginaw exit of Interstate 5.  Saginaw is northeast of Cottage Grove.

Climate
This region experiences warm (but not hot) and dry summers, with no average monthly temperatures above 71.6 °F.  According to the Köppen Climate Classification system, Saginaw has a warm-summer Mediterranean climate, abbreviated "Csb" on climate maps.

References

Unincorporated communities in Lane County, Oregon
Unincorporated communities in Oregon